When Nothing Else Matters is a 2004 non-fiction book by Michael Leahy. The book chronicles basketball player Michael Jordan's last comeback to the NBA playing for the Washington Wizards.

Bibliography
Leahy, Michael. (2004a) When Nothing Else Matters, New York. Simon & Schuster
Barnes, Simon. "When Nothing Else Matters by Michael Leahy", The Times, January 15, 2005.

References

2004 non-fiction books
Michael Jordan
Basketball books